Apocrypha are works, usually written, of unknown authorship or of doubtful origin.

Apocrypha may also refer to:

Biblical apocrypha, works sometimes attached to the Hebrew Bible
New Testament apocrypha, early Christian works rejected by most churches
"Apocrypha", an episode of The X-Files
Apocrypha, a realm in the video game The Elder Scrolls V: Skyrim – Dragonborn
Fate/Apocrypha, a light novel series and it's anime adaptation, taking place in an alternative timeline to Fate/stay night